Phulmati Devi Chaudhari is a Nepalese politician, belonging to the Rastriya Janshakti Party. After the 2008 Constituent Assembly election she became a Constituent Assembly member for Kailali District, elected through the proportional representation system.

References

Living people
Rastriya Janashakti Party politicians
Year of birth missing (living people)
Place of birth missing (living people)
Members of the 1st Nepalese Constituent Assembly